Fruin is a surname. Notable people with the surname include:

John J. Fruin, American civil engineer
Noah Wardrip-Fruin, American media theorist
Robert Fruin (1823–1899), Dutch historian
Shelley Fruin (born 1961), New Zealand cricketer
Tom Fruin (born 1974), American sculptor